Odayakulam is a panchayat town in Coimbatore district in the Indian state of Tamil Nadu.

Location

It is 3 kilometres from Anaimalai, which is famous for its Arulmigu Maasani Amman Temple. The villages around Odaiyakulam are Vettaikaranpudur, Sethumadai, Kaliapuram, Devipatinam. Odaiyakulam is on the border of Tamil Nadu with the neighbouring state Kerala.

Demographics

 India census, Odaiyakulam had a population of 11,668. Males constitute 50% of the population and females 50%. Odaiyakulam has an average literacy rate of 60%, higher than the national average of 59.5%: male literacy is 68%, and female literacy is 51%. In Odaiyakulam, 10% of the population is under 6 years of age.

References

Cities and towns in Coimbatore district